Pseudochromis persicus, the bluespotted dottyback, is a species of ray-finned fish from the Western Indian Ocean, which is a member of the family Pseudochromidae.

References

persicus
Taxa named by James A. Murray (zoologist)
Fish described in 1887